OCIUS Technology is an Australian company that specialised in solar/hybrid powered ferries but now focuses on marine drone development.

Notable vessels 

A chartered Solar Sailor ferry operates on Sydney Harbour, carrying 100 passengers.

A second ferry was built for the Shanghai World Expo, in association with Suntech Power, carrying 186 passengers.

Four ferries operate in Hong Kong carrying 100 passengers each.

See also 
 Hybrid vehicle
 Tûranor PlanetSolar
 List of solar-powered boats

References

External links 
 

Hybrid electric vehicles
Companies based in Sydney
Solar energy companies
Solar-powered vehicles
Holding companies of Australia
Australian companies established in 1999
Australian brands